United States special operations forces (SOF) are the special forces of the United States Department of Defense's United States Special Operations Command (USSOCOM) within the United States Armed Forces, used for special operations.

Composition
 Component commands
 United States Special Operations Command (SOCOM)
 Joint Special Operations Command (JSOC)
 United States Army Special Operations Command (USASOC)
 United States Marine Corps Forces Special Operations Command (MARSOC)
 United States Naval Special Warfare Command (NSWC)
 United States Air Force Special Operations Command (AFSOC)
 Theater Special Operations Commands
 Special Operations Command Africa (SOCAFRICA)
 Special Operations Command Central (SOCCENT)
 Joint Interagency Task Force – Counter Terrorism (JIATF-CT – Afghanistan) 
 Special Operations Command Central Forward (SOCCENT FWD)
 Special Operation Command Forward Yemen (SOC FWD-Y)
 SOCCENT Cultural Engagement Group (CEG)
 Special Operations Command Europe (SOCEUR)
 Joint Special Operations Air Component Europe
 Special Operations Command Pacific (SOCPAC)
 Special Operations Command South (SOCSOUTH)
 Special Operations Command North (SOCNORTH)
 Special Operations Command Korea (SOCKOR)

★★★ Represents a unit led by a lieutenant general or vice admiral
★★ Represents a unit led by a major general or rear admiral (upper half)
★ Represents a unit led by a brigadier general or rear admiral (lower half)

Joint Special Operations Command
Joint Special Operations Command (JSOC) ★★★
 1st Special Forces Operational Detachment-Delta (Airborne) (1st SFOD-D) (A) (USA)
 A Squadron (Assault)
 B Squadron (Assault)
 C Squadron (Assault)
 D Squadron (Assault)
 E Squadron (Aviation) 
 G Squadron (Intelligence, Reconnaissance, & Surveillance)
 Combat Support Squadron
 Signal Squadron
 Naval Special Warfare Development Group (USN)
 Blue Squadron (Assault)
 Gold Squadron (Assault)
 Red Squadron (Assault)
 Silver Squadron (Assault)
 Black Squadron (Intelligence, Reconnaissance, & Surveillance)
 White Squadron (EOD Tactics Development & Evaluation Squadron)
 Gray Squadron (Mobility Teams, Transportation/Divers)
 Green Squadron (Selection/Training)
 X Squadron (Experimental, R&D, technical innovations)
 Combat Support Squadron
 Technical Support Squadron (Tactical Cryptologic Support, Tactical Information Operations)
 Regimental Reconnaissance Company (RCC) (USA)
 RRD Team 1
 RRD Team 2
 RRD Team 3
24th Special Tactics Squadron (24th STS) (USAF)
 Black Team
 Blue Team
 Gold Team
 Gray Team 
 Silver Team
 Integrated Survey Program Team
 Green Team (OTC – Assessment, Selection, Training) 
 Joint Communications Unit (Joint Service)
 A Squadron
 B Squadron
 C Squadron
 D Squadron 
 Quick Reaction Team (QRT)
 Special Mission Troop (SMT)
 Executive Communications Detachment 
 Joint Cyber Operations Group (JCOG) (Formerly Joint Communications Integration Element/JCIE)(Joint Service)
 Joint Special Operations Command Intelligence Brigade (JSOCIB) 
 Joint Exploitation Squadron (JES)
 Joint GEOINT Squadron 
 Joint Processing, Exploitation and Dissemination (JPED) Squadron
 Geospatial Exploitation Troop (GET)
 Joint Exploitation Troop
 Joint Targeting Squadron (JTS) 
 Joint SIGINT Targeting and Exploitation Troop (JSTET)
 Joint Publicly Available Information (PAI) Troop 
 Interrogation and Exploitation Troop
 427th Special Operations Squadron (USAF)
 Intelligence Support Activity (USA)

United States Army

 United States Army Special Operations Command (USASOC) ★★★
 1st Special Forces Command (Airborne) ★★
 389th Military Intelligence Battalion (Airborne)
 1st Special Forces Group (Airborne)
Headquarters Company
1st Battalion
2nd Battalion
3rd Battalion
4th Battalion
Group Support Battalion
 3rd Special Forces Group (Airborne)
Headquarters Company
1st Battalion
2nd Battalion
3rd Battalion
4th Battalion
Group Support Battalion
 5th Special Forces Group (Airborne)
Headquarters Company
1st Battalion
2nd Battalion
3rd Battalion
4th Battalion
Group Support Battalion
 7th Special Forces Group (Airborne)
Headquarters Company
1st Battalion
2nd Battalion
3rd Battalion
4th Battalion
Group Support Battalion
 10th Special Forces Group (Airborne)
Headquarters Company
1st Battalion
2nd Battalion
3rd Battalion
4th Battalion
Group Support Battalion
 19th Special Forces Group (Airborne) (Army National Guard)
Headquarters Company
1st Battalion
2nd Battalion
3rd Battalion
Group Support Company
  20th Special Forces Group (Airborne) (Army National Guard)
Headquarters Company
1st Battalion
2nd Battalion
3rd Battalion
Group Support Company
 4th Psychological Operations Group (Airborne)
Headquarters Company
 6th POB(A) Battalion
 7th POB(A) Battalion
 8th POB(A) Battalion
  8th Psychological Operations Group (Airborne)
Headquarters Company
 1st POB(A) Battalion
 5th POB(A) Battalion
 9th POB(A) Battalion
 95th Civil Affairs Brigade (Airborne)
 91st Civil Affairs Battalion
 92nd Civil Affairs Battalion
 96th Civil Affairs Battalion
 97th Civil Affairs Battalion
  98th Civil Affairs Battalion
  528th Sustainment Brigade, Special Operations (Airborne)
 112th Special Operations Signal Battalion
 Special Troops Battalion
 195th Support Company (Army National Guard)
  197th Support Company
 75th Ranger Regiment
 1st Ranger Battalion
 2nd Ranger Battalion
 3rd Ranger Battalion
 Regimental Military Intelligence Battalion (Intelligence, Reconnaissance, & Surveillance)
 Headquarters and Headquarters Detachment
 Cyber Electromagnetic Activities (CEMA) Company 
 Military Intelligence Company 
  Special Troops Battalion
 Regimental Reconnaissance Company
 U.S. Army Special Operations Aviation Command (USASOAC) ★
 160th Special Operations Aviation Regiment (Airborne)
Headquarters Company
1st Battalion
2nd Battalion
3rd Battalion
4th Battalion
 USASOC Flight Company (UFC)
 Special Operations Training Battalion (SOATB)
 Systems Integration Management Office (SIMO)
 Technology Applications Program Office (TAPO)
  Special Operations Aviation Training Battalion
  United States Army John F. Kennedy Special Warfare Center and School (USAJFKSWCS) ★★
 1st Special Warfare Training Group (Airborne)
 2nd Special Warfare Training Group (Airborne) 
 Special Warfare Education Group (Airborne)
  Special Warfare Medical Group (Airborne)

United States Marine Corps

 United States Marine Corps Forces Special Operations Command (MARSOC) ★★
 Marine Raider Regiment
 1st Marine Raider Battalion
 2d Marine Raider Battalion
  3d Marine Raider Battalion
 Marine Raider Support Group
 1st Marine Raider Support Battalion
 2d Marine Raider Support Battalion
  3d Marine Raider Support Battalion
  Marine Raider Training Center

United States Navy

 Naval Special Warfare Command (NAVSPECWARCOM) ★★
 Naval Special Warfare Group ONE
 SEAL Team 1
 SEAL Team 3
 SEAL Team 5
 SEAL Team 7
 Logistics Support Unit 1
 Naval Special Warfare (NSW) Unit 1
  Naval Special Warfare (NSW) Unit 3
 Naval Special Warfare Group TWO
 SEAL Team 2
 SEAL Team 4
 SEAL Team 8
 SEAL Team 10
 Logistics Support Unit 2
 Naval Special Warfare (NSW) Unit 2
 Naval Special Warfare (NSW) Unit 4
  Naval Special Warfare Unit (NSW) 10
 Naval Special Warfare Group FOUR
 Special Boat Team 12 (SBT-12)
 Special Boat Team 20 (SBT-20)
 Special Boat Team 22 (SBT-22)
  Naval Small Craft Instruction and Technical Training School (NAVSCIATTS)
 Naval Special Warfare Group EIGHT
 SEAL Delivery Vehicle Team 1 (SDVT-1)
 SEAL Delivery Vehicle Team 2 (SDVT-2); was reactivated on 8 March 2019
 Logistics Support Unit 3
 Special Reconnaissance Team 1
 Special Reconnaissance Team 2
 Training Detachment 3
 Mission Support Center
 Naval Special Warfare Group ELEVEN
 SEAL Team 17 (Navy Reserve)
  SEAL Team 18 (Navy Reserve)
  Naval Special Warfare Center
 Basic Training Command
  Advanced Training Command

United States Air Force

 Air Force Special Operations Command (AFSOC) ★★★
 1st Special Operations Wing
 1st Special Operations Group
 4th Special Operations Squadron
 8th Special Operations Squadron
 9th Special Operations Squadron
 15th Special Operations Squadron
 23rd Weather Squadron
 34th Special Operations Squadron
  319th Special Operations Squadron
 24th Special Operations Wing
 720th Special Tactics Group
 17th Special Tactics Squadron
 21st Special Tactics Squadron
 22nd Special Tactics Squadron
 23rd Special Tactics Squadron
  26th Special Tactics Squadron
 720th Operations Support Squadron 
  724th Special Tactics Group
 24th Special Tactics Squadron
 724th Operations Support Squadron
  724th Intelligence Squadron
 724th Special Tactics Support Squadron
 27th Special Operations Wing
  27th Special Operations Group
 3rd Special Operations Squadron
 9th Special Operations Squadron
 16th Special Operations Squadron
 20th Special Operations Squadron
 33rd Special Operations Squadron
 56th Special Operations Intelligence Squadron
 73rd Special Operations Squadron
 318th Special Operations Squadron
  524th Special Operations Squadron
 137th Special Operations Wing (Air National Guard)
 193d Special Operations Wing (Air National Guard)
  193d Special Operations Squadron
 919th Special Operations Wing (Air Force Reserve)
  919th Special Operations Group
 2d Special Operations Squadron
 5th Special Operations Squadron
  711th Special Operations Squadron
 352d Special Operations Wing (Provisional)
 7th Special Operations Squadron
 67th Special Operations Squadron
  321st Special Tactics Squadron
 353rd Special Operations Group
 1st Special Operations Squadron
 17th Special Operations Squadron
 Detachment 1, 43rd Intelligence Squadron
  320th Special Tactics Squadron
  492nd Special Operations Wing ★
 19th Special Operations Squadron
 6th Special Operations Squadron
 18th Flight Test Squadron
 280th Combat Communications Squadron
 371st Special Operations Combat Training Squadron
 551st Special Operations Squadron
  United States Air Force Special Operations School

SOF career fields

United States Army

 Special Forces
 Rangers
 Psychological Operations (Military Information Support Operators)
 Civil Affairs Soldiers
 Army Special Operations Aviators
 Military Intelligence and other Special Operations/Support with enlisted Special Qualification (SQI) Identifier "S" or "K9" for Officers.

United States Marine Corps
 United States Marine Corps Critical Skills Operator (CSO)
 Enablers
 Special Operations Capabilities Specialist
 Combat Services Specialist

United States Navy
 Navy SEALs
 Special warfare combatant-craft crewmen (SWCC)
 Special amphibious reconnaissance corpsman (SARC)
 United States Navy EOD (EOD)
 Enablers (TECH)

United States Air Force
 Combat Rescue Officer
 Combat Control (CCT)
 Special Reconnaissance (SR)
 Special Tactics Officer (STO)
 Special Operations Surgical Team (SOST)
 Combat Aviation Advisor (CAA)
 Pararescuemen (PJ)
 Combat Rescue Officer (CRO)
 Tactical Air Control Party (ST TACP)
 Tactical Air Control Party Officer (ST TACP-O)
 Psychological Operations

 Not all PJs/CROs are assigned to AFSOC; many are assigned to Rescue Squadrons within ACC, PACAF, and USAFE. There is no difference in training or selection between Rescue and Special Tactics assignments.

 TACP-O/TACP Airmen must undergo additional selection and training to be assigned to AFSOC Special Tactics Squadrons. Most are assigned to ACC and support conventional Army Units.

U.S. special operations centers, schools, and courses

 International Special Training Center (ISTC) – Pfullendorf, Federal Republic of Germany
 Joint Special Operations University – Hurlburt Field
 Advanced Special Operations Techniques Course (ASOTC) – Fort Bragg
 John F. Kennedy Special Warfare Center and School – Fort Bragg
 Military Free Fall Advanced Tactical Infiltration Course (ATIC) – Yuma Proving Ground, Arizona
 Naval Special Warfare Center – Coronado, California
 Naval Special Warfare Advanced Training Command, Imperial Beach, CA
 Naval Small Craft Instruction and Technical Training School- John C. Stennis Space Center, Mississippi
 Recon and Surveillance Leaders Course (RSLC) – Fort Benning, Georgia
 Special Forces Advanced Urban Combat (SFAUC) – Fort Bragg
 Special Forces Combat Diver Qualification Course – Key West, Florida
 Special Forces Sniper Course (SFSC) – Fort Bragg
 Special Forces Advanced Targeting Reconnaissance Target Analysis Exploitation Techniques (SFARTAETC)
 Special Forces Physical Surveillance Course
 SOF Sensitive Site Exploitation, Technical Exploitation Course
 SOF Sensitive Site Exploitation, Operator Advanced Course
 Special Forces Master Mountaineering Course (Level 1)
 Special Forces Senior Mountaineering Course (Level 2)
 Winter Warfare, Mountain and Cold Weather Operations
 Special Forces Technical Surveillance (SFTSC)
 Operational Emergency Medical Skills Course (SOF)
 Marine Raider Training Center – Camp Lejeune
 Marine Corps Special Operations Training Group
 US Army Ranger Assessment and Selection Program (RASP) – Fort Benning, Georgia
 US Army Small Unit Ranger Tactics (SURT) – Fort Benning, Georgia
 USAF Combat Dive Course – NDSTC Panama City, Florida
 USAF Combat Control School – Pope Field, North Carolina
 USAF Pararescue Recovery Specialist Course – Kirtland AFB, NM
 USAF Special Operations School – Hurlburt Field, FL
 Special Tactics Training Squadron
 Special Operations Terminal Attack Control Course (SOTACC), Yuma Proving Ground, Arizona
 JTAC Advanced Instructor Course – Nellis AFB, NV
 Naval Strike and Air Warfare Center, Naval Air Station Fallon, NV
 US Navy Rescue Swimmer school, Pensacola, Florida
 US Coast Guard Joint Maritime Training Center, Camp Lejeune, North Carolina
 US Coast Guard Aviation Survival Technician Training Center, Coast Guard Air Station Elizabeth City, North Carolina

See also
United States Marine Corps Special Operations Capable Forces
U.S. Coast Guard Deployable Specialized Forces
U.S. Coast Guard MSST & MSRT teams
Military Liaison Element
Special Activities Center

References

External links
 David Ignatius: Learning to Fight a War – Washington Post, 2008-02-10
 US Special Operation Forces – 2009 SOCOM Factbook
 American Special Operations Forces